Yevheniy Stanislavovych Belych (born in Chernihiv 9 January 2001) is a Ukrainian professional footballer who plays for Desna Chernihiv.

Club career
Yevheniy Belych is a product of the Desna Chernihiv youth system.

Desna Chernihiv
He made his Ukrainian Premier League debut for Desna Chernihiv on 25 May 2019 in a game against FC Arsenal Kyiv. In June, he signed a professional contract extension with Desna, extending it at the end of the season.

Loan to Dinaz Vyshhorod
On 19 February 2021 he moved on loan to Dinaz Vyshhorod in the Ukrainian Second League. On 19 March, he made his debut with the new team against Chaika.

Return to Desna Chernihiv
On 25 July 2021, he made his return to the first team in the Ukrainian Premier League against Chornomorets Odesa, replacing Andriy Totovytskyi in the 87th minute.

Piast Nowa Ruda
On 18 March 2022, he moved to Piast Nowa Ruda in Poland.

International career
Between 2016 and 2017, Belych appeared four times for the Ukraine under-16 side, becoming the first Desna player to do so.

Career statistics

Club

References

External links
 
 
 Yevheniy Belych at FC Desna Chernihiv 
 
 

2001 births
Living people
Footballers from Chernihiv
SDYuShOR Desna players
FC Desna Chernihiv players
FC Desna-2 Chernihiv players
FC Desna-3 Chernihiv players
FC Dinaz Vyshhorod players
Ukrainian footballers
Ukraine youth international footballers
Association football midfielders
Ukrainian Premier League players
Ukrainian Second League players
III liga players
Expatriate footballers in Poland
Ukrainian expatriate sportspeople in Poland
21st-century Ukrainian people